Sudermann is a surname. Notable people with the surname include:

 Heinrich Sudermann (1520–1591), German jurist and official of the Hanseatic League
 Hermann Sudermann (1857–1928), German dramatist and novelist

See also
 Suderman

Low German surnames
Russian Mennonite surnames